The 1905 Dickinson football team was an American football team that represented Dickinson College as an independent during the 1905 college football season. The team compiled a 4–4 record and outscored opponents by a total of 122 to 72. J. William Williams was the head coach.

Schedule

References

Dickinson
Dickinson Red Devils football seasons
Dickinson football